This is a list of Sonoma County Landmarks as designated by the Sonoma County's Landmark Commission.

It is intended to include all Sonoma County government-designated landmarks in unincorporated areas of Sonoma County, but to exclude landmarks in separately incorporated cities and towns.  In general, the county will not designate landmarks within the borders of the county's cities and towns.  However, within the current area of Windsor, California, which was not incorporated until 19xx, the county had already designated several landmarks.  Windsor has assumed responsibility for these historic sites and has collected the documentation of those sites' histories. These Windsor sites are listed now within Windsor historical landmarks article and are not repeated here.

Some degree of preservation of historic nature of the Sonoma County Landmarks is performed by the County of Sonoma's Permit and Resource Management Department.  (Which does not itself designate landmarks, but follows requirements for it to protect duly designated sites.)

Click the "Map of all coordinates" link to the right to view a Google map of all properties and districts with latitude and longitude coordinates in the table below.

Sonoma County listings

|-
|}

References

Tourist attractions in Sonoma County, California